Carabus arvensis  is a species of beetle in family Carabidae. It is found in the Palearctic

Description 
A large granulate bronze or green ground beetle with a body length of 16-20mm.

Distribution
Europe north to the Arctic Circle and east across the Palearctic to Siberia , Sakhalin and Japan.

Biology
A montane moorland and blanket bog species in the West. Found in dry woods in the East.

References

Carabidae
Beetles described in 1784